Sergei Vasilievich Rachmaninoff (1873–1943) was a Russian composer, virtuoso pianist, and conductor. Rachmaninoff is widely considered one of the finest pianists of his day and, as a composer, one of the last great representatives of Romanticism in Russian classical music.

Recordings

Phonograph
Many of Rachmaninoff's recordings are acknowledged classics. Rachmaninoff first recorded in 1919, for Edison Records' unusual "Diamond Discs", as they claimed the best audio fidelity in recording the piano at the time. Thomas Edison, who was musically unsophisticated and quite deaf, did not care for Rachmaninoff's playing and referred to him as a "pounder" at their initial meeting. However, the staff at Edison's New York recording studio (led by company pianist Robert Gayler) asked Edison to reconsider his dismissive position, resulting in a limited contract for ten released sides. The Edison company took some care with its piano recordings but used an unusual make, the Lauter, made in Newark; Rachmaninoff recorded on a Lauter concert grand, one of the few the company made. Rachmaninoff believed his own performances to be variable in quality and requested that he be allowed to approve any recordings for commercial release. Edison agreed but still issued multiple takes, a very unusual practice which was routine at Edison, where strict company policy demanded three good takes of each selection to mitigate the effects of production wear and provide redundancy in case of damage to a metal master; in practice, this meant to the staff that takes passed for issue were interchangeable, but it was also very wearing on artists who often had to record an item several times over to produce each of those three problem-free takes. Edison's staff and Rachmaninoff were pleased with the released discs and wanted to record more, but Thomas Edison refused to engage the pianist for further work, saying the ten sides were sufficient for label prestige purposes. 
 

Rachmaninoff signed a contract with the Victor Talking Machine Company (later RCA Victor) in 1920. The company was pleased to comply with Rachmaninoff's restrictions, and proudly advertised him as one of their prominent recording artists. His recordings for Victor continued until 1942, when the American Federation of Musicians imposed a recording ban on their members.
 
Particularly renowned are his renditions of Schumann's Carnaval and Chopin's Funeral March Sonata, along with many shorter pieces. He recorded all four of his piano concertos with the Philadelphia Orchestra, including two versions of the second concerto with Leopold Stokowski conducting (an acoustical recording in 1924 and an electrical remake in 1929), and the world premiere recording of the Rhapsody on a Theme of Paganini, soon after the first performance (1934) with the Philadelphians under Stokowski. The first, third, and fourth concertos were recorded with Eugene Ormandy in 1939-41. Rachmaninoff also made three recordings conducting the Philadelphia Orchestra in his own Third Symphony, his symphonic poem Isle of the Dead, and his orchestration of Vocalise.  All of these recordings were reissued in a 10-CD set "Sergei Rachmaninoff The Complete Recordings" in RCA Victor Gold Seal 09026-61265-2, along with subsequent reissues.
 
This listing below includes only recordings in which Rachmaninoff himself was a participant, as either pianist or conductor.  Recordings of Rachmaninoff’s music made by other performers are not included.

Piano rolls
Rachmaninoff also performed several works on piano rolls. Several manufacturers, in particular the Aeolian Company, published his compositions on perforated music rolls from about 1900 onwards. His sister-in-law, Sofia Satina, remembered him at the family estate at Ivanovka, pedalling gleefully through a set of rolls of his Second Piano Concerto, apparently acquired from a German source, most probably the Aeolian Company's Berlin subsidiary, the Choralion Company. Aeolian in London created a set of three rolls of this concerto in 1909, which remained in the catalogues of its various successors until the late 1970s.
From 1919 he made 35 piano rolls (12 of which were his own compositions), for the American Piano Company (Ampico)'s reproducing piano. According to the Ampico publicity department, he initially disbelieved that a roll of punched paper could provide an accurate record, so he was invited to listen to a proof copy of his first recording. After the performance, he was quoted as saying "Gentlemen—I, Sergei Rachmaninoff, have just heard myself play!" For demonstration purposes, he recorded the solo part of his Second Piano Concerto for Ampico, though only the second movement was used publicly and has survived. He continued to make roll recordings until around 1929, though his last roll, the Chopin Scherzo in B-flat minor, was not published until October 1933.

References

Additional references used in creating tables: 
http://gmlile.com/rachdiary/listingroleD.aspx?d=true
http://gmlile.com/rachdiary/listingroleE.aspx?e=true
Booklet from Sergei Rachmaninoff Complete Recordings, RCA/BMG 09026-61265-2

Sergei Rachmaninoff
Rachmaninoff